Joel K. Tyler is a United States Army major general who is Chief of Staff of the United States Africa Command. He was previously the director of operations and cyber of the United States Africa Command, commanding general of the United States Army Test and Evaluation Command, and prior to that the commander of the United States Army Joint Modernization Command. In March 2021, he was assigned to replace Major General William Gayler as the Chief of Staff of the United States Africa Command.

Tyler attended the University of Arkansas, where he participated in the Army Reserve Officers' Training Corps program and earned a commission and a Bachelor of Arts degree in political science in 1988. He later received a Master of Science degree in public administration from Central Michigan University and a Master of Arts degree in national security and strategic studies from the College of Naval Warfare.

References

Central Michigan University alumni
Living people
Naval War College alumni
Place of birth missing (living people)
United States Army generals
United States Army personnel of the Gulf War
United States Army personnel of the Iraq War
University of Arkansas alumni
Year of birth missing (living people)